Juniperus excelsa, commonly called the Greek juniper, is a juniper found throughout the eastern Mediterranean, from northeastern Greece and southern Bulgaria across Turkey to Syria and Lebanon, Jordan, the Caucasus mountains, and southern coast of Crimea.

A subspecies, J. excelsa subsp. polycarpos, known as the Persian juniper, occurs in the Alborz and other mountains of Iran east to northwestern Pakistan, and an isolated population in the Jebal Akhdar mountains of Oman; some botanists treat this as a distinct species, Juniperus polycarpos.

Description

It is largely dioecious with separate male and female plants, but some individual plants produce both sexes. The cones are berry-like, 6–11 mm in diameter, blue-black with a whitish waxy bloom, and contain 3-6 seeds; they are mature in about 18 months. The male cones are 3–4 mm long, and shed their pollen in early spring.

It often occurs together with Juniperus foetidissima, being distinguished from it by its slenderer shoots 0.7–1.3 mm diameter (1.2–2 mm diameter in J. foetidissima), and grey-green, rather than mid green, leaves.

The Algum wood mentioned in the Bible may be from this species, but is not definitely so.

References

 
Adams, R. P. (2004). Junipers of the World: The genus Juniperus. Victoria: Trafford. .
Farjon, A. (2005). Monograph of Cupressaceae and Sciadopitys. Royal Botanic Gardens, Kew. .
Gymnosperm Database: Juniperus excelsa
photo of tree in southwest Turkey

External links

 Juniperus excelsa - information, genetic conservation units and related resources. European Forest Genetic Resources Programme (EUFORGEN)

excelsa
Flora of Europe
Least concern plants
Flora of Bulgaria
Dioecious plants